Kuyagan is a rural locality (a selo) and the administrative center of Kuyagansky Selsoviet, Altaysky District, Altai Krai, Russia. The population was 779 as of 2013. There are 19 streets.

Geography 
Kuyagan is located on the Kuyagan River, 52 km southwest of Altayskoye (the district's administrative centre) by road. Kazanka is the nearest rural locality.

References 

Rural localities in Altaysky District, Altai Krai